In finite group theory, a branch of mathematics, a group is said to be of characteristic 2 type or even type or of even characteristic if it resembles a group of Lie type over a field of characteristic 2.

In the classification of finite simple groups, there is a major division between group of characteristic 2 type, where involutions resemble unipotent elements, and other groups, where involutions resemble semisimple elements.

Groups of characteristic 2 type and rank at least 3 are classified by the trichotomy theorem.

Definitions

A group is said to be of even characteristic if 
 for all maximal 2-local subgroups M that contain a Sylow 2-subgroup of G.
If this condition holds for all maximal 2-local subgroups M then G is said to be of characteristic 2 type.
 use a modified version of this called even type.

References

Finite groups